Merida (IPA: [me'ridɐ]), officially the Municipality of Merida, is a 5th class municipality in the province of Leyte, Philippines. According to the 2020 census, it has a population of 31,574 people.

History

Located east of Ormoc City, facing the Camotes Islands and Camotes Sea, Merida is nestled at the Westside of Ormoc City where agriculture, to include fishing is the major livelihood among the populace. A tradition and a rich heritage since the Spanish regime is a strong and lasting heritage to San Isidro Labrador sustained by the inhabitants tracing back from the original settlers up to the present. Since the Spanish conquest, the Meridanhons faithfully adopted the humble farmer, San Isidro Labrador, especially that agriculture is the dominant economy of the locality.

The town was formerly situated in a place now known as Betaug. It was then called ‘Siapun after a river near the settlement. The town used to be a barrio of Ormoc. In 1860, however, the barrio was organized as a town and was promulgated in 1867 by Domingo Fernandez, the District Governor of the Province of Leyte. The first Spanish overseer nostalgically named it Merida after his native city in Spain which, like their own, lies along the bank of a river in the river Guardiana

The first leader of the town government was German Justo, succeeded by Blas Bohol, and then Leonardo Macion and Teodoro Cabiling commonly called Captain Doro. Other town notables were Rufino Santiago, Alejo Ugsad, Nicolas Gumba, Ramon Lamoste Inong, Teodoro Laurel, Cipriano Macion, Antonio Francisco, Semon Sangan and Romualdo Boholst, all who served as Governadorcillo during the Spanish time.

Merida was formally included in the parish of Ormoc, and only became independent parish in 1918. The following were the Parish Priests of Merida during the Spanish time: Fr. Ramon Abarca, Fr. Eduardo Alarcon, Fr. Lino Codilla and Fr. Diego Paras. Along the coast, Merida lies between the City of Ormoc and the progressive town of Isabel, 17 kilometers to the south. Concrete roads and bridges link Merida with adjacent towns and city direct to the capital city of Tacloban. It may be noted that Isabel, formerly named “Quiot” was made municipality by the Spaniards in 1850 which lasted 52 years and was merged into the town of Merida by virtue of Act No. 954 of the Philippine Commission. However, through the help of Ex-Senator Carlos S. Tan and Pres. Manuel A. Roxas, it was restored as a municipality by virtue of Rep. Act No. 191 of 1947, of the congress of the Philippines and Proc. No. 49, and named “Isabel” after the wife of the Senator. The newly appointed officials headed by Galicano Ruiz were inducted to office by the late Deputy Gov. Cipriano Macion of Merida.

Geography

Barangays
Merida is politically subdivided into 22 barangays.

Climate

Demographics

Economy

Education 

The town has five high schools including the Libas National High School and Merida Vocational School which has annexes in various barangays: MVS Calunangan, MVS Puerto Bello, MVS Minesite. The main campus is located in Greenheights District just a few meters away from the Municipal Hall.

Merida Vocational School 

Merida Vocational School is known for its skills development program which opens a variety of vocational courses such as the following:
Drafting Technology
Cosmetology
Culinary Arts
Garments
SMAW Welding
Furniture and Cabinet Making
Building Construction
Automotive Servicing
Building-Wiring Installation

Notable personalities
 John Riel Casimero - Professional Boxing World Champion

References

External links
 [ Philippine Standard Geographic Code]
Philippine Census Information
Local Governance Performance Management System

Municipalities of Leyte (province)